

The 69th Regiment Armory is a historic National Guard armory building located at 68 Lexington Avenue between East 25th and 26th Streets in the Rose Hill section of Manhattan, New York City. The building began construction in 1904 and was completed in 1906. The armory was designed by the firm of Hunt & Hunt, and was the first armory built in New York City to not be modeled on a medieval fortress; instead, it was designed in the Beaux-Arts style.

The Armory was the site of the controversial 1913 Armory Show, in which modern art was first publicly presented in the United States, per the efforts of Irish American collector John Quinn. It has a 5,000 seat arena that is used for sporting and entertainment events such as the Victoria's Secret Fashion Show. The Armory is also the former home of the Civil Air Patrol – Phoenix Composite Squadron. The building is still used to house the headquarters of the New York Army National Guard's 1st Battalion, 69th Infantry Regiment (known as the "Fighting Irish" since Gettysburg), as well as for the presentation of special events.

The building was declared a National Historic Landmark in 1965, and a New York City landmark in 1983.

Notable events

 In 1913, the Armory Show exhibited art from many contemporary artists such as Vincent Van Gogh, Pablo Picasso, Henri Matisse, Raoul Dufy, Marcel Duchamp, Andre Dunoyer de Segonzac, and more. It was the first large-scale modern art show in the United States. It received mixed reactions from the public and media for its controversial new art forms, such as cubism, fauvism, and post-impressionism. It was a success and eventually moved on to Chicago and Boston.
Thure Johansson of Sweden broke Dorando Pietri's indoor record for the marathon at the 69th Regiment Armory on March 1, 1910 (2:36:55.2). As of May 2010, the Association of Road Racing Statisticians notes that Johansson's mark still stands as the sixth fastest time on an indoor track.
Starting November 29, 1948 through early 1949, the Armory hosted at least 17 roller derby matches, including the first matches ever broadcast on television.
The Armory was the site of some New York Knicks home games from 1946 to 1960, including all their home games during the 1951, 1952 and 1953 NBA Finals, due to other events being booked at the time at their normal home, Madison Square Garden. The New York Americans – now the Brooklyn Nets – of the new American Basketball Association wanted to play at the Armory in 1967, but pressure from the Knicks on the Armory management forced the new club to play in Teaneck, New Jersey, instead.
In 1994, the rock group Soundgarden performed two shows at the Armory (on June 16 and 17), as part of the tour in support of their Superunknown album.
In 1996, NBA Entertainment used the Armory to film Denzel Washington's portions of the documentary NBA at 50.
After the September 11, 2001, attacks, the Armory served as a counseling center for the victims and families.
In 2002, 2003, 2005, 2009, 2010, 2011, 2012, 2013 and 2015 the Armory was the venue used for the Victoria's Secret Fashion Show.
The Armory has been the site of the Museum of Comic and Cartoon Art's MoCCA Art Festival since 2009.
The Architectural League of New York staged its annual "Beaux Arts Ball" at the Armory in 2013, to mark the centennial of the 1913 "Armory Show". For the event the ALNY commissioned giant illuminated cubist puppets designed by Processional Art Workshop
In May 2014, The Armory hosted the inaugural edition of the Downtown Art Fair in which work from leading art galleries was offered for sale.

See also
List of New York City Landmarks
National Register of Historic Places listings in New York County, New York

References
Explanatory notes

Citations

Source

External links

 
 Official unit website - includes link to a slide tour of armory from the home page
 69th Regiment
 NYC Architecture
 New York Times Article on the Commanders Room

1906 establishments in New York City
Armories in New York City
Armories on the National Register of Historic Places in New York (state)
Athletics (track and field) venues in New York City
Badminton venues
Basketball venues in New York City
Event venues on the National Register of Historic Places in New York City
Former National Basketball Association venues
Former sports venues in New York City
Infrastructure completed in 1906
Installations of the United States Army National Guard
Military facilities on the National Register of Historic Places in Manhattan
National Historic Landmarks in Manhattan
New York City Designated Landmarks in Manhattan
Rose Hill, Manhattan
Sports venues completed in 1906
St. Francis Brooklyn Terriers men's basketball